The following radio stations broadcast on AM frequency 1290 kHz: 1290 AM is a Regional broadcast frequency

In Argentina
 Interactiva in Ciudad Madero
 LRI371 Amanecer in Reconquista, Santa Fe
 LRJ212 Murialdo in Guaymallén, Mendoza
 Provinciana in San Miguel

In Canada

In Mexico
 XEDA-AM in La Magdalena Atlazol, DF 
 XEIX-AM in Jiquilpan, Michoacán

In the United States

In Uruguay 
 CX 38 Emisora del Sur in Montevideo

References

Lists of radio stations by frequency